Kayla Rose Maisonet (born June 20, 1999) is an American actress and influencer. She portrayed Georgie Diaz in the Disney Channel sitcom Stuck in the Middle, and Lindsay in the Disney Channel sitcom Dog with a Blog, and Izzy on the ABC sitcom Speechless.

Career
Maisonet began acting in 2011. Her first appearance was in a short film called A New York Fairy Tale. In 2012 she worked on the television pilot Shmagreggie Saves The World, which later went unsold.

Maisonet landed a recurring role in the Disney Channel series Dog with a Blog playing the recurring character Lindsay, Avery's best friend, which she held throughout the show's run. For her role, in 2014, she won a Young Artist Award. In 2013, Maisonet also had a recurring role on the Nickelodeon series The Haunted Hathaways as Lilly.

In 2016, Maisonet was cast in the main role of Georgie Diaz on the Disney Channel sitcom Stuck in the Middle, which ran until 2018. In 2018, she had a recurring role as Izzy on the comedy television series Speechless, which she played for nine episodes.

Filmography

Awards and nominations

References

External links
 

1999 births
Living people
American child actresses
American television actresses
American actresses of Puerto Rican descent
American people of Russian-Jewish descent
Hispanic and Latino American actresses
Jewish American actresses
21st-century American actresses
21st-century American Jews
Place of birth missing (living people)